Xiao Zhi (born on May 28, 1985) is a Chinese professional footballer who currently plays for China League Two club Qingdao Hainiu as a striker.

Club career
Xiao Zhi started his football career with second-tier football club Nanjing Yoyo, where he would establish himself as a regular within the team before he was sold to his local football club Henan Jianye for 1.3 million Yuan. With his new club he would play within the top tier and make his debut for them on March 11, 2007, when he made his first league appearance against Beijing Guoan in a 0–0 draw. Due to his versatility to play as a winger or striker he would find significant playing time and score his first goal against Changchun Yatai on November 4, 2007, in a 3–2 victory. By the end of season he would make 23 league appearances and though these often came as a substitute he would still play a large part in Henan's establishment in the Chinese Super League.

On January 27, 2016, Xiao transferred to fellow Chinese Super League side Guangzhou R&F. He would make his debut in a league game against Hebei China Fortune F.C. on March 4, 2016, in a 2–1 defeat. In his first campaign he played 25 times in the league that season, scoring six goals. Xiao signed a contract extension with R&F on January 25, 2017.

On July 17, 2020, Xiao joined Tianjin TEDA. He would make his debut in a league game against Shanghai SIPG F.C. on July 27, 2020, in a game that ended in a 3–1 defeat.

International career
On June 7, 2017, Xiao made his debut and scored for the Chinese national team in an 8–1 win against Philippines.

Career statistics

Club
Statistics accurate as of match played December 31, 2020.

International

Scores and results list China's goal tally first.

Honours

Club
Henan Jianye
China League One: 2013

References

External links
Player stats at sohu.com
Squad profile at Henan Jianye website
 

1985 births
Living people
Sportspeople from Luoyang
Chinese footballers
Footballers from Henan
Nanjing Yoyo players
Henan Songshan Longmen F.C. players
Guangzhou City F.C. players
Tianjin Jinmen Tiger F.C. players
Chinese Super League players
China League One players
Association football forwards
Association football midfielders
China international footballers
2019 AFC Asian Cup players